Joseph Henry Hirst (1863–1945) was a leading architect of the post-Victorian era. For 1900–1926 he was the City Architect of Kingston upon Hull and "the man who more than any other designed the face of the modern city".
He was responsible for some of Hull's best-known buildings, among them the City Hall, swimming baths, schools and housing estates.

Buildings designed by Joseph Hirst
 Trinity market hall near Holy Trinity Church, Hull
 Beverley Road baths
 Hull Central Fire Station
 the Carnegie Library near West Park
 Residences on Hymers Avenue, Hull, near Hymers College

Publications 
 (1913) The block houses of Kingston-upon-Hull and who went there: A glimpse of catholic life in the penal times and a missing page of local history. Hull: A. Brown & Sons.
 (1916) The Armorial Bearings of Kingston Upon Hull. Hull: A. Brown & Sons.

References

External links
 Hirst's 1911 census record
 Reminiscence of the War, largely relating to his son, who served in France as a 2nd Lieutenant with the East Yorkshire Regiment
 Individual and family records at Hull Local History Centre.

19th-century English architects
Architects from Kingston upon Hull
1863 births
1945 deaths
20th-century English architects